Isagoras is a genus of striped walkingsticks in the family Pseudophasmatidae. There are more than 25 described species in Isagoras.

Species
These 26 species belong to the genus Isagoras:

 Isagoras affinis Chopard, 1911
 Isagoras apolinari Hebard, 1933
 Isagoras aurocaudata Heleodoro & Rafael, 2018
 Isagoras bishopi Rehn, J.A.G., 1947
 Isagoras brevipes Redtenbacher, 1906
 Isagoras chocoensis Hebard, 1921
 Isagoras chopardi Hebard, 1933
 Isagoras dentipes Redtenbacher, 1906
 Isagoras ecuadoricus Hebard, 1933
 Isagoras jurinei (Saussure, 1868)
 Isagoras kheili (Bolívar, 1896)
 Isagoras metricus Rehn, J.A.G., 1947
 Isagoras nitidus Redtenbacher, 1906
 Isagoras paulensis Piza, 1944
 Isagoras phlegyas (Westwood, 1859)
 Isagoras plagiatus Redtenbacher, 1906
 Isagoras proximus Redtenbacher, 1906
 Isagoras rugicollis (Gray, G.R., 1835)
 Isagoras santara (Westwood, 1859)
 Isagoras sauropterus Rehn, J.A.G., 1947
 Isagoras schraderi Rehn, J.A.G., 1947
 Isagoras subaquilus Rehn, J.A.G., 1947
 Isagoras tacanae Günther, 1940
 Isagoras venezuelae Rehn, J.A.G., 1947
 Isagoras venosus (Burmeister, 1838)
 Isagoras vignieri (Redtenbacher, 1906)

References

Further reading

 

Phasmatodea genera